alpha-Naphthoflavone, also known as 7,8-benzoflavone and 2-phenyl-benzo(h)chromen-4-one, is a synthetic flavone derivative.  It can be prepared from 2-naphthol and cinnamaldehyde.

alpha-Naphthoflavone is a potent inhibitor of the enzyme aromatase, the enzyme that converts testosterone to estrogen. alpha-Naphthoflavone has been shown to cause abnormal testicular development in young chickens.

See also
 beta-Naphthoflavone
 C19H12O2

References

CYP1A2 inhibitors
Aromatase inhibitors
Benzochromenes
Flavonoids